Mancheswar railway station is a railway station in Bhubaneswar, Odisha. Its code is MCS. The station consists of four platforms. The platform is not well sheltered; it lacks many facilities including water and sanitation. Trains like Paradeep–Visakhapatnam Weekly SF Express, Puri–Sai Nagar Shirdi Weekly Express, Puri–Durg Express, Puri–Ajmer Bi-Weekly Express, and Visakhapatnam–Tatanagar Weekly Express pass through the station.

Railway Carriage Repair Workshop
The railway carriage repair workshop of East Coast Railway is at Mancheswar railway station. It also houses a basic training center which was established in 1989 to impart training for apprenticeships and various initial and promotional courses.

References

Khurda Road railway division
Railway stations in India opened in 1896
Railway stations in Bhubaneswar